The 1920–21 Austrian First Class season was the tenth season of top-tier football in Austria. Once again the league expanded to 13 teams with SK Rapid Wien getting their seventh title by six points over second place SV Amateure.

League standings

Results

Top goalscorers
.

References

Austria - List of final tables (RSSSF)

Austrian Football Bundesliga seasons
Austria
1920–21 in Austrian football